An iron cross is a gymnastics skill on the rings in which the body is suspended upright while the arms are extended laterally, forming the shape of the Christian cross. It is a move that requires significant shoulder and bicep tendon strength.

Other common variations of the move include the vertically inverted cross and the Maltese cross, in which the gymnast holds his body parallel to the ground at ring height with arms extended laterally.

The International Gymnastics Federation code of points lists the iron cross (or L-cross) as a "B" value skill.

See also
Calisthenics

References

Static elements (gymnastics)